Oak Grove Butterfield Stage Station is located in the western foothills of the Laguna Mountains, in northern San Diego County, California. The station was built on the site of Camp Wright, an 1860s Civil War outpost.

Camp Wright
During the American Civil War, Camp Wright was a Union Army outpost in the Pacific Coast Theater of the American Civil War. It was established to protect the route to Fort Yuma on the Colorado River, and intercept secessionist sympathizers traveling to the east to join the Confederate Army.  A detachment of California Volunteer cavalry and infantry first established Camp Wright at Warner's Ranch near Warner Springs, in October 1861.  The cold and windy conditions in the higher altitude of the exposed San Jose Valley caused the commander to change its site to the more sheltered Oak Grove location in November.

At about the same time, the Dan Showalter party of secessionists were attempting to avoid the post and make their way across the desert to join the Confederate Army in Texas.  They were pursued from Temecula by a 1st Regiment California Volunteer Cavalry patrol from Camp Wright, intercepted in the hills west of the San Jose Valley (site of Warner's Ranch) with the support of a 1st California Infantry detachment from the camp, and captured without shots being fired  November 20–29, 1861.  After being imprisoned at Fort Yuma, Showalter and the others were released upon swearing loyalty to the Union.  They later made their way to the Confederacy.

For a short time in March 1862 Camp Wright was the headquarters of the 5th Regiment California Volunteer Infantry before it moved on.  Used for the rest of the war as a transit camp for troops moving along the road to and from New Mexico Territory and Arizona Territory, the camp was abandoned in 1866.

The Oak Grove Butterfield Stage Station, in operation between 1858 and 1860, is the only surviving station of the Butterfield Overland Mail stagecoach line across the Western United States. The adobe building the stagecoach station used was built in 1858, and on the former  site of Camp Wright (1861-1862). It was a stop between Los Angeles and Fort Yuma on the San Francisco to St. Louis route. It is a well-preserved one-story adobe building among California oak woodlands.

Historic Landmarks

The site of Camp Wright was registered as a California Historical Landmark in 1950.

The Oak Grove Butterfield Stage Station on its site was registered as a separate California Historical Landmark in 1952. The Oak Grove station was declared a National Historic Landmark in 1961.  The location of another nearby station at Warner's Ranch, is also a National Historic Landmark.

See also
Butterfield Overland Mail in California
Warner's Ranch Butterfield Stage Station
Pony Express
San Antonio-San Diego Mail Line

References

External links

National Park Service: Oak Grove Butterfield Station
National Park Service—Discover Our Shared Heritage program: "Early History of the California Coast" — travel Itinerary.

Butterfield Overland Mail in California
Adobe buildings and structures in California
Transportation buildings and structures in San Diego County, California
California in the American Civil War
Forts in California
American Civil War army posts
Warner Springs, California
History of San Diego County, California
California Historical Landmarks
National Historic Landmarks in California
National Register of Historic Places in San Diego County, California
1858 establishments in California
1850s in California
1860s in California
Closed installations of the United States Army
American frontier
Laguna Mountains
Stagecoach stations on the National Register of Historic Places
Stagecoach stations in California
Transportation buildings and structures on the National Register of Historic Places in California